The Shanghai Botanical Garden is a botanic garden located in the southwestern suburbs of Shanghai, China, (around 12 km southwest of the city centre) in the Xuhui District.

Covering 81.86 hectares, the garden has a renowned penjing garden, as well as collections of magnolias, roses, azaleas, peonies, conifers, maples, osmanthus and bamboo.

History
The Shanghai Botanical Garden was established in 1974, and is located on the site of Longhua Nursery. The largest municipal botanic garden in China, it has won prizes in the Netherlands and Canada with plant displays. The garden is a member of Botanic Gardens Conservation International.

Features

Covering 81.86 hectares, the garden has a diverse collection of Chinese plants, including 3500 species of local regional flora from the Middle and Lower Yangtze River are located in the gardens.

The Penjing Garden was established in 1978 and is 4 hectares (9.9 acres) in size. A penjing museum was added in 1995. The 5000 square metre Tropicarium was opened to the public in 2001. It is a conservatory with 3500 species of tropical and subtropical plant.

Established in 1988, The Magnolia Garden covers 1.51 hectares and has 40 species, including Magnolia denudata, Magnolia liliiflora, Magnolia grandiflora, Magnolia cylindrica, Magnolia amoena, Michelia chapensis, Liriodendron chinense and others, including Magnolia × soulangeana. Established in 1980, the Peony Garden covers 3.24 hectares and has 120 cultivars of tree peony that were developed in China.

The Bamboo Garden was established in 1978 and has 74 species of bamboo across its 3.6 hectares. The 5.33 hectares of the Conifer Garden contain 280 species and varieties of conifer.

The garden employs a hundred horticultural staff, ten educational staff and thirty research staff.

Transportation
Shanghai Botanical Garden can be reached on the Shanghai Metro using Shanghai Metro Line 3 to Shanghai South Railway Station or Shilong Road Station. Alternatively, it can be accessed by rail from the main Shanghai South railway station.

See also
List of Chinese gardens

External links 
Official website (in Chinese)

References

1974 establishments in China
Botanical gardens in China
Buildings and structures in Shanghai
Tourist attractions in Shanghai
Gardens in Shanghai